Nassarawa is a Local Government Area in Kano State, Nigeria. Its headquarters are in the locality of Bompai, within the city of Kano.

It has an area of 34 km and a population of 678,669 at the 2006 census.

The postal code of the area is 700.

Places 
Nasarawa is well known by its gate kofar Nasarawa and the famous bridge of Gadan Nasarawa.

References

Local Government Areas in Kano State